State Route 81 (SR 81) is an east–west route in western Ohio.  Its western terminus is at the Indiana state line near Willshire (the route continues as State Road 124), and its eastern terminus is at SR 53 in Patterson.  The route also goes through or close to the towns of Elgin, Lima, Ada, and Dunkirk.

History
SR 81 was certified by 1927.  It was originally routed from Ada to Patterson on the former northernmost section of the now-defunct SR 69. At the time of SR 81's current designation, SR 69 was rerouted to Mount Cory (this route is now part of SR 235). SR 81 was extended to the Indiana state line in 1940 along formerly unnumbered roads from Ada to Lima and along the route of the now-defunct SR 704 (which was created in 1937) from Lima to the state line. No major changes have occurred to the routing since then.

From 1923 to 1926, SR 81 was a short route in northeastern Ohio between Brentwood Lake and Twinsburg. In 1926, the route became part of SR 82.

Major junctions

References

External links

081
Transportation in Van Wert County, Ohio
Transportation in Allen County, Ohio
Transportation in Hardin County, Ohio